Gause is an unincorporated community and census-designated place in Milam County, Texas, United States. According to the Handbook of Texas, the community had an estimated population of 400 in 2000. It was first listed as a CDP in the 2020 census with a population of 275.

Geography
Gause is located at  (30.7851923, -96.7213641 ). It is situated along U.S. Highway 79/190, sixteen miles southeast of Cameron and twenty-nine miles west of Bryan/College Station.

History
The community is named for William J. Gause, a settler who moved to the area in 1872 and built a home out of lumber hauled from Montgomery. This caused the area to grow and a post office opened in 1874. A schoolhouse that doubled as a church was built in 1876. Gause had approximately 300 residents in 1884 as well as two steam-powered cotton gins and two churches. Gause was a shipping point for Milam County farmers who shipped corn, cotton, and cottonseed oil. The Gause Independent School District was established in 1905.

The population reached its peak around 1915, when 1,000 people lived in the community. Gause slowly declined over the next few decades. Its bank was discontinued in 1927 after 17 years in operation. The combination of a decline in the number of businesses in Gause and the introduction of the automobile precipitated further downturns in the local economy. By the 1960s, the community had 278 residents, down from 750 in the 1940s. The population began to rebound in the late 1980s as more people chose to live in Gause and commute to jobs in nearby industrial plants. In 1990, Gause had 400 residents and eight businesses. The population remained unchanged as of 2000. Despite its unincorporated status, Gause continues to have a functioning post office (zip code:77857).

Education
Public education in the community of Gause is provided by the Gause Independent School District. The district operates a single campus that serves an estimated 150 students in grades pre-kindergarten through eight.

Notable people
Lance Archer, (b 1977) is a professional wrestler, currently signed to All Elite Wrestling (AEW) 
Ruthie Foster,  (b 1964) is a singer-songwriter of blues and folk music.
Ox Miller, (1915–2007) was a professional baseball pitcher for St. Louis Browns
Jo-Jo Moore, (1908–2001) was a Major League Baseball who player for the New York Giants
Bob Wills, (1905–1975) was a Western swing musician, songwriter, and bandleader, Bob Wills and his Texas Playboys.

References

Census-designated places in Milam County, Texas
Census-designated places in Texas
Unincorporated communities in Milam County, Texas
Unincorporated communities in Texas